Dasht-e Razm may refer to:
 Dasht-e Razm-e Musa Arabi
 Dasht-e Razm-e Olya